This is a list of caves of in South Africa. A cave or cavern is a natural underground space large enough for a human to enter. The term may refer to sea caves, rock shelters, and grottos.

List of caves in South Africa

See also
 List of caves
 List of South African caving organisations
 Speleology

References

LIst
South Africa
Caves
Caves